Louis Archinard (11 February 1850 – 8 May 1932) was a French Army general at the time of the Third Republic, who contributed to the colonial conquest of French West Africa. He was traditionally presented in French histories as the conqueror and "Pacifier" of French Soudan (today Mali). Archinard's campaigns brought about the end of the Tukulor Empire.  He also spent a large amount of energy fighting Samory Toure. 

Archinard was succeeded as military commander of the Sudan in 1893 by Eugène Bonnier, who left from Bordeaux on 5 August 1893 to take up his new command.
Bonnier had no instructions and decided to follow Archinard's advice, use his own judgement and seize Timbuktu.
He was killed on 15 December 1893 by a force of Tuaregs.

In 1897 Archinard was reassigned to French Indochina.
In World War I, he commanded in August 1914 the 1er Group of Reserve Divisions, and in 1917-1918 the Polish Legion in France.

Decorations
Légion d'honneur
Knight (25 August 1881)
Officer (9 July 1889)
Commander (11 July 1903)
Grand Officer (30 December 1908)
Grand Cross (11 July 1914)
Médaille militaire (6 July 1919)
Croix de guerre 1914-1918
Médaille Interalliée 1914–1918
Commemorative medal of the 1870–1871 War.
Médaille commémorative de la guerre 1914–1918
Médaille Coloniale with "Soudan" bar.

References

Sources

E. Réquin, Archinard et le Soudan, Éditions Berger-Levrault, 1946
Martine Cuttier, Portrait du colonialisme triomphant - Louis Archinard 1850-1932, Éditions Lavauzelle, 2006 - 
 A. S. Kanya-Forstner,  The Conquest of the Western Sudan (Cambridge University Press, 1969). Chapter  VII. The `Total Conquest' of the Sudan, 1888-93.
O'Toole, Thomas E., Historical Dictionary of Guinea, (Metuchen, New Jersey: The Scarecrow Press, 1987) p. 18

External links
 

1850 births
1932 deaths
People from Le Havre
French colonial governors and administrators
Colonial Governors of French Mali
People of French West Africa
People of the French Third Republic
French military personnel of the Franco-Prussian War
French military personnel of World War I
Grand Croix of the Légion d'honneur
Recipients of the Croix de Guerre 1914–1918 (France)
19th-century French military personnel
20th-century French military personnel